Woodlake is an unincorporated community in Trinity County, Texas, United States.  Located on U.S. Route 287, it lies 4 miles southeast of Groveton. In 1990, the estimated population was 301 residents.

Historical development
The town was originally settled around the mid-1860s, but did not see any real growth until the 1880s when the Thompson and Tucker Lumber Company was established there. The post office opened in 1889 under the name Willard, and would remain open until 1910. By the time World War I occurred, the timber in the region was exhausted, and the sawmill was dismantled. The name Woodlake was chosen for what remained of the town in 1925, after the small reservoir that had supplied the mill. The Great Depression and the downfall of the Waco, Beaumont, Trinity and Sabine Railway impacted the local economy. In 1934 the United States Government took over an unsuccessful agricultural project started by Helen Kerr Thompson (a relative of the former mill owner), and new housing would be built. The project failed and many of the residents moved away. A youth camp was established there as the Baptist Church of East Texas purchased the community buildings.  Although Woodlake is unincorporated, it has a post office with an address of 5923 US Hwy 287 Woodlake, Tx  75865-9600, questioning its status as a city or a town.

References

Unincorporated communities in Trinity County, Texas
Unincorporated communities in Texas
Logging communities in the United States